Tim Gannon is an American businessman and polo player.

Early life
Tim Gannon graduated from Florida State University, with a degree in Art History.

Career
Gannon started his career at the Four Seasons Hotel, Steak & Ale and Al Copeland's Cajun Cafe in New Orleans. From 1984 to 1987, he served as Vice President and Director of Development of Al Copeland Enterprises. In 1988, he co-founded Outback Steakhouse. In 2006, he created OSI Restaurant Partners, which operates Outback Steakhouse, Carrabba's Italian Grill, Bonefish Grill, Roy's Restaurant and Fleming's Prime Steakhouse & Wine Bar. He sits on the Advisory Board of Thayer Ventures.

In 1994, Inc. named him Entrepreneur of the Year. He is the recipient of the Florida Restaurant Association's Lifetime Achievement Award and an honorary doctorate from Johnson & Wales University. He was inducted in the Tampa Bay Chamber of Commerce Business Hall of Fame.

Polo
Gannon sponsors the Outback Polo Team. He has won three U.S. Open Polo Championship, in 1995 (with Julio Arellano, Sebastian Merlos and Guillermo Gracida, Jr.), 1996 (with Valerio Aguilar, Mike Azzaro, Jeff Blake and Guillermo Gracida, Jr.) and 1999 (with Jeff Blake, Adolfo Cambiaso and Lolo Castagnola). In 2013, he was inducted into the Museum of Polo and Hall of Fame in Lake Worth, Florida.

His son, Chris Gannon, is also a polo player. In recent year, his son opened a chain of fast-casual dining restaurants across Florida that feature gluten-free and vegan options named Bolay. His Outback Polo Team, whose other players include Adolfo Cambiaso, Fabio Diniz, Santiago Chavanne, won the U.S. Open Polo Championship in 2001.

References

Living people
Florida State University alumni
American businesspeople
American polo players
Year of birth missing (living people)